Lee Seung-wook (born 1993) is a former South Korean actor and model. He is best known for his roles in dramas and movies such as Wind-Bell and Gonjiam: Haunted Asylum.

Career
Lee made his debut in the movie Gonjiam: Haunted Asylum. Some days after the film was released, Lee announced his departure from the entertainment industry. He mentioned that his decision was for personal reasons.

Filmography

Television series

Film

References

External links 
 
 
 

1993 births
Living people
21st-century South Korean male actors
South Korean male models
South Korean male television actors
South Korean male film actors